The History of the Second World War is the official history of the British contribution to the Second World War and was published by Her Majesty's Stationery Office (HMSO). The immense project was sub-divided into areas to ease publication, United Kingdom Military Series, the United Kingdom Civil Series for the civilian war effort; the Foreign Policy series, the Intelligence series and the Medical series are eponymous. Other volumes not under the aegis of the series but published by HMSO may be read as adjuncts, covering matters not considered in great detail or at all, in one case, in the main series. Further volumes, published after the privatisation of HMSO or in the series about the Special Operations Executive, are also useful.

The volumes were intended to be read individually, rather than in series, which led to some overlapping. In their introductions to their parts of the series, Sir Keith Hancock and Sir James Butler wrote that this was to obviate a need to read more volumes than those covering that part of the war effort. Hancock edited the Civil Series and Butler the Military Series. The first volume appeared in 1949 and the last in 1993, with a revised edition of one volume appearing in 2004. An unorthodox decision was to cover the conflict from a theatre of operations point of view rather than by service, to acknowledge that military operations were intimately linked.

The works published before 1970 lack references to unpublished sources until government archives were opened, to an extent, by the Public Records Act 1958 and the Public Records Act 1967. The works were published with only references to published sources because British constitutional conventions on the anonymity of government officials and ministers were followed, leading to a somewhat detached narrative style in some cases. A parallel series of volumes for official use were printed, which referenced the unpublished sources in manuscript, in red ink. A few official copies 'escaped' into public libraries and these additions can be seen.

Volumes

United Kingdom Military Series
 Grand Strategy
 Volume I, Norman Gibbs, 1976
 Volume II, Sir James Butler, 1957
 Volume III, Part 1, J. M. A. Gwyer, 1964
 Volume III, Part 2, Sir James Butler, 1964
 Volume IV, Sir Michael Howard, 1970
 Volume V, John Ehrman, 1956
 Volume VI, John Ehrman, 1956
 The War at Sea
 Volume I: The Defensive, Captain Stephen Roskill, 1954
 Volume II: The Period of Balance, Captain Stephen Roskill, 1956
 Volume III, Part 1: The Offensive, Captain Stephen Roskill, 1960
 Volume III, Part 2: The Offensive, Captain Stephen Roskill, 1961
 The Strategic Air Offensive against Germany
 Volume I: Preparation, Sir Charles Webster and Noble Frankland, 1961
 Volume II: Endeavour, Sir Charles Webster and Noble Frankland, 1961
 Volume III: Victory, Sir Charles Webster and Noble Frankland, 1961
 Volume IV: Annexes and Appendices, Sir Charles Webster and Noble Frankland, 1961
 Defence of the United Kingdom, Basil Collier, 1957
 The Campaign in Norway, Thomas Derry, 1952 (transcribed HTML copy)
 The War in France and Flanders, 1939–40, Major Lionel Ellis, 1954 (transcribed HTML copy)
 Victory in the West
 Volume I: Battle of Normandy, Major L. F. Ellis et al., 1962
 Volume II: Defeat of Germany, Major L. F. Ellis et al., 1968
 War against Japan
 Volume I: The Loss of Singapore, Major-General Stanley Kirby et al., 1957
 Volume II: India's Most Dangerous Hour, Major-General Stanley Kirby et al., 1958
 Volume III: The Decisive Battles, Major-General Stanley Kirby et al., 1961
 Volume IV: The Reconquest of Burma, Major-General Stanley Kirby et al., 1965
 Volume V: The Surrender of Japan, Major-General Stanley Kirby et al., 1969
 The Mediterranean and Middle East
 Volume I: The Early Successes against Italy, to May 1941, Major-General I. S. O. Playfair et al., 1954
 Volume II: The Germans Come to the Help of Their Ally, 1941, Major-General I. S. O. Playfair et al., 1956
 Volume III: British Fortunes Reach Their Lowest Ebb, Major-General I. S. O. Playfair et al., 1960
 Volume IV: The Destruction of the Axis Forces in Africa, Major-General I. S. O. Playfair, Brigadier Charles Molony et al., 1966
 Volume V: The Campaign in Sicily, 1943 and the Campaign in Italy, 3 September 1943 to 31 March 1944, Brigadier Charles Molony et al., 1973
 Volume VI, Part 1: Victory in the Mediterranean: 1 April to 4 June 1944, General Sir William Jackson et al., 1984
 Volume VI, Part 2: Victory in the Mediterranean: June to October 1944, General Sir William Jackson et al., 1987
 Volume VI, Part 3: Victory in the Mediterranean: November 1944 to May 1945, General Sir William Jackson et al., 1988
 Civil Affairs and Military Government
 Central Organisation and Planning, Frank Donnison, 1966
 British Military Administration in the Far East, 1943–46, Frank Donnison, 1956
 North-West Europe, 1944–46, Frank Donnison, 1961
 Allied Military Administration of Italy, 1943-1945, Charles Harris, 1957

United Kingdom Civil Series
 Introductory
 British War Economy, Keith Hancock and Margaret Gowing, 1949 (transcribed HTML copy)
 Statistical Digest of the War, Central Statistical Office, 1949 (partially transcribed HTML copy)
 Problems of Social Policy, Richard Titmuss, 1950  ( transcribed HTML copy)
 British War Production, Michael Postan, 1952 ( transcribed HTML copy)
 General Series
 Coal, W. B. Court, 1951
 Oil: A Study of Wartime Policy and Administration, D. J. Payton-Smith, 1971
 Studies in the Social Services, Sheila Ferguson, 1978
 Civil Defence, T. H. O'Brien, 1955
 Works and Buildings, C. M. Kohan, 1952
 Food
 Volume I: The Growth of Policy, R. J. Hammond, 1951
 Volume II: Studies in Administration and Control, R. J. Hammond, 1956
 Volume III: Studies in Administration and Control, R. J. Hammond, 1962
 Agriculture, K. A. H. Murray, 1955
 The Economic Blockade
 Volume I, William Medlicott, 1952
 Volume II, William Medlicott, 1957
 Inland Transport, Christopher Savage, 1957
 Merchant Shipping and the Demands of War, Betty Behrens, 1955
 North American Supply, H. Duncan Hall, 1955
 Manpower: Study of War-Time Policy and Administration, H. M. D. Parker, 1957
 Civil Industry and Trade, Eric Hargreaves, 1952
 Financial Policy, 1939–45, Richard Sayers, 1956
 War Production
 Labour in the Munitions Industries, P. Inman, 1957
 The Control of Raw Materials, Joel Hurstfield, 1953
 The Administration of War Production, J. D. Scott, 1955
 Design and Development of Weapons: Studies in Government and Industrial Organisation, M. M. Postan, 1964
 Factories and Plant, William Hornby, 1958
 Contracts and Finance, William Ashworth, 1953
 Studies of Overseas Supply, H. Duncan Hall, 1956

Foreign Policy
 British Foreign Policy in the Second World War
 Volume I, Sir Llewellyn Woodward, 1970
 Volume II, Sir Llewellyn Woodward, 1971
 Volume III, Sir Llewellyn Woodward, 1971
 Volume IV, Sir Llewellyn Woodward, 1975
 Volume V, Sir Llewellyn Woodward, 1976
 Abridged Version, Sir Llewellyn Woodward, 1962

Intelligence
 British Intelligence in the Second World War
 Volume I: Its Influence on Strategy and Operations, F. H. Hinsley et al., 1979
 Volume II: Its Influence on Strategy and Operations, F. H. Hinsley et al., 1981
 Volume III, Part 1: Its Influence on Strategy and Operations, F. H. Hinsley, E. E. Thomas, C. F. G. Ransom, R. C. Knight, 1984
 Volume III, Part 2: Its Influence on Strategy and Operations, F. H. Hinsley et al., 1988
 Volume IV: Security and Counter-Intelligence, F. H. Hinsley et al., 1990
 Volume V: Strategic Deception, Michael Howard, 1990
 Abridged Version, F. H. Hinsley, 1993
 SOE in France, M. R. D. Foot, 1966 (repr. 2004)

Medical Volumes
 The Emergency Medical Services
 Volume I: England and Wales, edited by Cuthbert Dunn, 1952
 Volume II: Scotland, Northern Ireland and Principal Air Raids on Industrial Centres in Great Britain, edited by Cuthbert Dunn, 1953
 The Royal Air Force Medical Services
 Volume I: Administration, edited by S. C. Rexford-Welch, 1954
 Volume II: Command, edited by S. C. Rexford-Welch, 1955
 Volume III: Campaigns, edited by S. C. Rexford-Welch, 1958
 The Royal Naval Medical Service
 Volume I: Administration, Jack Coulter, 1953
 Volume II: Operations, Jack Coulter, 1955
 The Army Medical Services
 Administration
 Volume I, Francis Crew, 1953
 Volume II, Francis Crew, 1955
 Campaigns
 Volume I: France and Belgium, 1939–40, Norway, Battle of Britain, Libya, 1940–42, East Africa, Greece, 1941, Crete, Iraq, Syria, Persia, Madagascar, Malta, Francis Crew, 1956
 Volume II: Hong Kong, Malaya, Iceland and the Faroes, Libya, 1942–43, North-West Africa, Francis Crew, 1957
 Volume III: Sicily, Italy, Greece (1944–45), Francis Crew, 1959
 Volume IV: North-West Europe, Francis Crew, 1962
 Volume V: Burma, Francis Crew, 1966
 The Civilian Health and Medical Services
 Volume I: The Civilian Health Services; Other Civilian Health and Medical Services, Arthur MacNalty, 1953
 Volume II: The Colonies, the Medical Services of the Ministry of Pensions, Public Health in Scotland, Public Health in Northern Ireland, Arthur MacNalty, 1955
 Medical Services at War: The Principal Lessons of the Second World War, Arthur MacNalty, 1968
 Medicine and Pathology, Zachary Cope, 1952
 Surgery, Zachary Cope, 1953
 Medical Research, edited by F. H. K. Green and Major-General Sir Gordon Covell, 1953
 Casualties and Medical Statistics, edited by William Franklin, 1972

Supplementary HMSO works
 The Royal Air Force, 1939–45
 Volume I: Fight at Odds, Denis Richards, 1953 (transcribed HTML copy)
 Volume II: Fight Avails, Denis Richards and Hilary St George Saunders, 1953 (transcribed HTML copy)
  Volume III: Fight is Won], Hilary St George Saunders, 1954 ([transcribed HTML copy)
 British Military Administration of Occupied Territories in Africa during the Years 1941–1947, Major-General Francis Rodd, 1948

Other official departmental histories
A number of official histories were produced by government departments. The authors worked under the same conditions and had the same access to official files but their works did not appear in the History of the Second World War.
 Britain and Atomic Energy 1939–1945 Margaret Gowing, 1964.

Supplementary works from other publishers
 SOE Histories
 SOE in the Far East, Charles Cruikshank, 1983
 SOE in Scandinavia, Charles Cruikshank, 1986
 SOE in the Low Countries, M. R. D. Foot, 2001
 Secret Flotillas
 Volume I: Clandestine Sea Operations to Brittany 1940–44, Sir Brooks Richards, 2004
 Volume II: Clandestine Sea Operations in the Mediterranean, North Africa and the Adriatic 1940–44, Sir Brooks Richards, 2004
 Army Series, printed by the War Office, 30 volumes
 Royal Electrical and Mechanical Engineers
 Volume I Organisation and Operations, Rowcroft, E. Bertram (1951)
 Volume II Technical, Bloor, F. R. (1951)
 Supplies and Transport 2 volumes, Boileau, D. W. (1954)
 Works service and Engineer stores, Buchanan, A. G. B. (1953)
 Fighting, support and transport vehicles and the War Office provision for their provision
 Part 1 Common  Problems, Campagnac R. & Hayman P. E. G. (1951)
 Part 2 Unarmoured Vehicles, Campagnac R. & Hayman P. E. G. (1951)
 Maintenance in the field 2 volumes, Carter, J. A. H. (1952)
 Maps and Survey, Clough, A. B. (1952)
 The Auxiliary Territorial Service, Cowper, J. M. (1949)
 Movements, Higham, J. B. & Knighton, E. A. (1955)
 Signal Communications, Gravely, T. B. (1950)
 Quartering, Magnay, A. D. (1949)
 Miscellaneous Q services, Magnay, A. D. (1954)
 Mobilization, McPherson, A. B. (1950)
 Discipline, McPherson, A. B. (1950)
 Transportation, Micklem, R. (1950)
 Army welfare, Morgan, M. C. (1953)
 Ordnance services, Officers of the directorate (1950)
 Airborne Forces, Oatway, T. B. H. (1951)
 The development of artillery, tactics and equipment, Pemberton, A. L. (1950)
 Manpower problems, Pigott, A. J. K. (1949)
 Army Radar, Sayer, A. P. (1950)
 Morale, Sparrow, J. H. A. (1949)
 Personnel selection, Ungerson, B. (1952)
 Military Engineering (field), Pakenham-Walsh, R. P. (1952)
 Administrative planning, Wilson, H. W. (1952)
 Special Weapons and types of warfare 3 volumes, Wiseman, D. J. C. (1951–53)
 Volume I Gas Warfare
 Volume II Screening smoke, signal smoke, flame warfare insecticide & insect repellent & special common use equipment
 Volume III Visual & Sonic warfare
 Royal Air Force Series, printed by the Air Ministry
 Airborne Forces (1951)
 Air/Sea Rescue (1952)
 Air Support (1956)
 Armament
 Volume I Bombs & Bombing Equipment (1952)
 Volume II Guns, Gunsights, Turrets, Ammunition and Pyrotechnics (1954)
 Maintenance (1954)
 Signals
 Volume I Organisation and Development (1958)
 Volume II Telecommunications (1958)
 Volume III Aircraft Radio (1956)
 Volume IV Radar in Raid Reporting (1950)
 Volume V Fighter Control and Interception (1952)
 Volume VI Radio in Maritime Warfare (1954)
 Volume VII Radio Counter-Measures (1950)
 Works (1956)

See also
 Actes et documents du Saint Siège relatifs à la Seconde Guerre Mondiale, official document collection of Vatican City pertaining to World War II
 Australia in the War of 1939–1945, official war history of Australia
 Germany and the Second World War, semi-official German history
 Official History of New Zealand in the Second World War 1939–45, official war history of New Zealand
 Official war histories of the United States
 The Army Air Forces in World War II
 United States Army in World War II
 History of United States Naval Operations in World War II
 The Kingdom of the Netherlands During World War II, official war history of the Netherlands
 The Second World War by Winston Churchill

Footnotes

References

External links
 Hypertext versions of some volumes at HyperWar

Historiography
Series of history books about World War II
United Kingdom in World War II
Book series introduced in 1949
Official military history books